Jerky is lean trimmed meat cut into strips and dried (dehydrated) to prevent spoilage. Normally, this drying includes the addition of salt to prevent bacteria growth before the meat has finished the dehydrating process. It originated in the Andes mountains in what is modern day Peru and the word "jerky" derives from the Quechua word ch'arki which means "dried, salted meat". All that is needed to produce basic "jerky" is a low-temperature drying method, and salt to inhibit bacterial growth.

Modern manufactured jerky is often marinated, prepared with a seasoned spice rub or liquid, or smoked with low heat (usually under 70 °C/160 °F). Store-bought jerky commonly includes sweeteners such as brown sugar.

Jerky is ready-to-eat, needs no additional preparation and can be stored for months without refrigeration. To ensure maximum shelf-life, a proper protein-to-moisture content is required in the final cured product.

Many products which are sold as jerky consist of highly processed, chopped and formed meat rather than traditional sliced whole-muscle meat. These products may contain more fat, but moisture content, as in the whole-muscle product, must meet a 0.75 to 1 moisture-to protein ratio in the US.
Chemical preservatives can prevent oxidative spoilage, but the moisture-to-protein ratio prevents microbial spoilage by low water activity. Some jerky products are very high in sugar and  therefore taste very sweet – unlike biltong, which rarely contains added sugars.

Preparation 
 

Jerky is made from domesticated animals as well as game animals. Jerky from domesticated animals includes beef, pork, goat and mutton or lamb and game animals such as deer, kudu, springbok, kangaroo, and bison are also used. Recently, other animals such as turkey, salmon, and earthworm have entered the market.

Most fat must be trimmed from the meat prior to drying, as fat increases the chances of spoilage (modern vacuum packing and chemical preservatives have served to help prevent these risks). The meat must be dried quickly to limit bacterial growth during the critical period where the meat is not yet dry. To accomplish drying quickly without the use of high temperature, which would cook the meat, the meat must be sliced or pressed thin.

In industrial settings, large low-temperature drying ovens with many heater elements and fans make use of exhaust ports to remove the moisture-laden air. The combination of fast-moving air and low heat dries the meat to the desired moisture content within a few hours. The raw, marinated jerky strips are placed on racks of nylon-coated metal screens which have been sprayed with a light vegetable oil to allow the meat to be removed easily. The screen trays are placed closely in layers on rolling carts which are then put in the drying oven.

Chemical preservatives, such as sodium nitrite, are often used in conjunction with the historical salted drying procedure to prepare jerky. Smoking is the most traditional method, as it preserves, flavors, and dries the meat simultaneously. Salting is the most common method used today, as it both provides seasoning to improve the flavor as well as preserve the meat. While some methods involve applying the seasonings with a marinade, this can increase the drying time by adding moisture to the meat.

Packaging
 

After the jerky is dried to the proper moisture content to prevent spoilage, it is cooled, then packaged in (often resealable) plastic bags, either nitrogen gas flushed or vacuumed packed. To prevent the oxidation of the fat, the sealed packages often contain small pouches of oxygen absorber. These small packets are filled with iron particles which react with oxygen, removing the oxygen from the sealed jerky package, and from an opened and resealed unfinished packet.

Because of the necessary low fat and moisture content, jerky is high in protein. A 30 g (about 1 oz) portion of lean meat, for example, contains about 7 g of protein. By removing 15 g of water from the meat, the protein ratio is doubled to nearly 15 g of protein per 30 g portion. In some low moisture varieties, a 30 g serving will contain 21 g of protein, and only one g of fat. The price per unit weight of this type of jerky is higher than less-dried forms, as it takes 90 g of 99% lean meat to generate 30 g of jerky.

Unpackaged fresh jerky made from sliced, whole muscle meat has been available in specialty stores in Hong Kong at least since the 1970s. The products are purchased by kilograms, and customers choose from 10 to 20 types of meat used to make the product. Some are sold in strands instead of slices. Macau has opened numerous specialty shops also, many of which are franchise extensions of stores from Hong Kong. Compared to the sealed packaged versions, unpackaged jerky has a relatively short shelf life.

This type of jerky has also become very popular in convenience stores in the United States under the name "slab" jerky; it is usually sold in plexiglass containers.

Regulation
Most nations have regulations pertaining to the production of dried meat products. There are strict requirements to ensure safe and wholesome production of jerky products. Factories are required to have inspectors and sanitation plans. In the United States, the U.S. Department of Agriculture (USDA) is responsible for that oversight. To comply with USDA regulations, poultry jerky must be heated to an internal temperature of 160 °F (71 °C) for uncured poultry or 155 °F (68 °C) for cured poultry to be considered safe Many European Union countries presently prohibit the importation of meat products, including jerky, without additional and extensive customs documentation, and further inspections.

Availability
 

Traditional jerky, made from sliced, whole muscle meat, is readily available in the United States, Mexico, and Canada in varying meats, brands and qualities, both as packaged and unpackaged. These products are available in nearly every convenience store, gas station, supermarket, and variety shop in those countries, where there is a long history of jerky as a food of the pioneers. A similar, less expensive product is made with finely ground meat, mixed with flavors, then the mush is processed into thin dried strips. The finished item may be labeled as jerky, but with the qualifier "ground and formed". This product is widely available in general interest stores, such as supermarkets and convenience stores.
Also popular is shredded dry jerky (meat floss) sold in containers resembling snuff or dip. Jerky made in the traditional style is also a ubiquitous staple of farmers' markets in rural areas all over North America.

In addition to being common in the United States, Mexico, and Canada, jerky is also gaining popularity in supermarkets, convenience stores and online retailers in Australia, New Zealand, the United Kingdom and Germany. They are carried by some major supermarkets, and now also smaller stores. In China, in addition to the more traditional forms of jerky, there is also a similar product which is usually made from pork called pork chip. A similar product is quite popular in Rome and its hinterland: it is called coppiette and was originally made with horse or donkey meat, but it is now generally made with pork. Coppiette are seasoned with red pepper and fennel seeds. Coppiette were usually eaten while drinking wine (mostly white) in Roman restaurants.

In Tamil Nadu, India, the dish is known as uppu kandam which forms part of authentic non-vegetarian cuisine. In kerala (India), it is known as "idi irachi", 'idi'=shredded since the dried meat strip is normally shredded before frying and 'irachi'=meat. It is normally eaten after deep frying rather than having it as it is. In Ethiopia, jerky is called qwant'a. In addition to salt, it is seasoned with black pepper and either berbere or awaze. A similar product, biltong, is common in South African cuisine; however, it differs very much in production process and taste. In Hausa cuisine, kilishi is a form of dried meat, similar to jerky, that is heavily spiced with peppers.

Jerky (or products closely related to it) is commonly included in military field rations. It is particularly attractive to militaries because of its light weight, high level of nutrition, long shelf life and edibility without further preparation. Since 1996, jerky has been selected by astronauts as space food several times for space flight due to its light weight and high level of nutrition.

Nutrition 
A typical 30 g portion of fresh jerky contains 10–15 g of protein, 1 g of fat, and 0–3 g of carbohydrates, although some beef jerky can have a protein content above 65%. Since traditional jerky recipes use a basic salt cure, sodium can be a concern for some people. A 30 g serving of jerky could contain more than 600 mg of sodium, which would be about 30% of the recommended USRDA.

Ch'arki

Ch'arki (Quechua for dried, salted meat, Hispanicized spellings charque, charqui, charquí) is a dried, salted meat product. Andean charqui, made in Peru, Bolivia and Chile, is from alpaca, llama or alpaca-llama cross-breeds. Peru is the world's largest producer with approximately 450 tons produced per year. Brazilian charque is made from beef.

The manufacture of charqui principally consists of salting and sun-drying. In some regions, such as in Puno, the meat is sliced before drying; in others, like Cusco, the meat is dried from whole bone-in carcass pieces, known as 'charqui completo'.

It was industrialized in charqueadas (in Brazil) or saladeros (in Argentina and Uruguay). In the United States ch'arki was Anglicised as jerky.

When encountered by the Spanish, the Inca Empire supplied tampu (inns) along the Inca road system with llama ch'arki for travelers. The Inca used a freeze drying process that took advantage of their cold dry mountain air and strong sun.

See also

References

External links

Commercial Item Description (CID): Cured Meat Snacks  U.S. Dept. of Agriculture specification
U.S. Dept. of Agriculture: Jerky and food safety fact sheet
Authentic Beef Jerky from Outback Australia (Nive Beef)

Dried meat
Snack foods
Convenience foods
Quechua words and phrases
Fur trade